This is a list of candidates of the 1918 South Australian state election.

Retiring MPs

Liberal

 David James (Wooroora) – lost preselection
 James Howe MLC (Northern District) – retired

Independent

 Clarence Goode (Victoria) – retired

There had also been two resignations in the months leading up to the election which had remained unfilled. Sturt National MP Thomas Ryan had resigned on 16 November 1917 following his election to the Parliament of Victoria at the 1917 Victorian election, while Liberal Midland District MLC Edward Lucas had resigned on 1 February 1918 following his appointment as Agent-General for South Australia. In addition, Newcastle Labor MP Andrew Kirkpatrick shifted houses, contesting the Legislative Council in Central District No. 1.

House of Assembly
Sitting members are shown in bold text. Successful candidates are marked with an asterisk.

Legislative Council

Sitting members are shown in bold text. Successful candidates are marked with an asterisk.

Notes
 The three Barossa candidates were candidates of the Farmers and Producers Country Party (FPCP or F&PCP).

References

1918 elections in Australia
Candidates for South Australian state elections
1910s in South Australia